This list of mosasaur type specimens is a list of fossils that are official standard-bearers for inclusion in the species and genera of the squamate clade Mosasauroidea, which includes the line of predatory marine lizards that culminates in the mosasaurids. Type specimens are definitionally members of biological taxa, and additional specimens are "referred" to these taxa only if an expert deems them sufficiently similar to the type.

The list

References

Mosasaur